Rated XXX is a compilation album by East coast rap group Kool G. Rap & DJ Polo released in 1996.

Track listing

1996 albums
Kool G Rap albums
Albums produced by Marley Marl